Geoffrey II may refer to:

 Geoffrey II, Viscount of Châteaudun (died 1040)
 Geoffrey II (archbishop of Bordeaux) (died 1043)
 Geoffrey II, Count of Gâtinais (died 1043/6)
 Geoffrey II of Thouars (990-1055)
 Geoffrey II, Count of Anjou (died 1060), surnamed Martel, Count of Anjou from 1040
 Geoffrey II of Provence, (died 1067), first count of Forcalquier from 1062
 Geoffrey II, Count of Perche (died 1100)
 Geoffrey II of Vendôme (died 1102), lord of Preuilly from 1067
 Geoffrey II, Duke of Brittany (1158–1186), Duke of Brittany from 1181
 Geoffrey II of Villehardouin (c. 1195-1246), Prince of Achaea from c. 1229
 Geoffrey II of Briel (fl. late 13th century)